Andrei Gennadyevich Sveshnikov (born 22 March 1979 in Moscow) is a former Russian football player.

References

1979 births
Footballers from Moscow
Living people
Russian footballers
FC Saturn Ramenskoye players
Russian Premier League players
FC Oryol players
Kapaz PFK players
Russian expatriate footballers
Expatriate footballers in Azerbaijan

Association football defenders